Tim Welker is a German footballer who plays as a centre back, most recently for TSV Steinbach.

References

External links
 

1993 births
Living people
German footballers
Association football defenders
2. Bundesliga players
Regionalliga players
SC Paderborn 07 players
KSV Hessen Kassel players
TSV Steinbach Haiger players